Maxime Rodolphe Nouchy, known as Maxim Nucci and Yodelice (born 23 February 1979 in Créteil), is a French singer-songwriter who performs in English. He has released five albums as of 2014: "Maxim Nucci" (2006),  Tree of Life (2009), Cardioid (2010), "Square Eyes" (2013) and "Like a Million Dreams" (2014). The songs belong to folk, rock and pop music. He is also known for his acting performance in Guillaume Canet's film Little White Lies (French title: Les Petits Mouchoirs) with Marion Cotillard in 2010. The song "Talk to me" was featured.

Life
Maxim Nucci was born in Créteil, an eastern suburb of Paris, on 23 February 1979. He entered the conservatory of music at the age of six, and learned to play the piano and the guitar. When he was 15, he began to attend classes at the Musician Institute of London. After graduation, he became the youngest teacher of the academy in 1994.

Nucci had been playing with his band, Max, in England when he sent a demo to several record labels. Universal Music France expressed interest.

He had a child with Jenifer Bartoli, the first winner of the French Star academy.

Career
Nucci appeared on television during 2001. He partly composed the first album by L5–a female band created during a popular reality TV show, Popstars. He also helped the debut singers in recording their album.

His first single "Dis à l'amour".

In 2004, he starred as an actor and a composer in Alive, directed by Frédéric Berthe, in which a producer works with a gifted young songwriter and they find success together. The film was not a box-office success.

Nucci released an eponymous album in 2006.

Nucci went to Spain in the Casa Yodelice and start writing new songs, and re-emerged as Yodelice.

The project was named the Casa Yodelice and the "Spookland" world is said to epitomize the peculiar atmosphere of its music, between life appetite and melancholy.

Yodelice was awarded the best new artist prize during the 2010 Victoires de la Musique.

Discography

Albums
As Maxim Nucci

As Yodelice

Soundtracks
2004: Alive (soundtrack of film)

Singles
As Maxim Nucci

As Yodelice

Promotional singles (as Yodelice)
2009: "Free"
2010: "Emergency"

References

External links
Official website
Facebook

French musicians
Living people
1979 births